Hillcrest High School, formerly Vickery Meadows High School is a public secondary school located in North Dallas, Texas (USA). Hillcrest High School enrolls students in grades 9–12 and is a part of the Dallas Independent School District. In 2018, the school was rated "Met Standard" by the Texas Education Agency.

History 
The school opened in 1938 as Vickery Meadows High School. In 1945 it was renamed to Hillcrest High School.

Prior to the 1970s Hillcrest was known as "Hebrew High" due to the number of Jewish students enrolled.

Campus
The Franklin Stadium is located at Hillcrest. In June 2011 the DISD board voted against renaming the stadium after John McClamrock.

In fall 2019 a new addition with 22 classrooms, an administrative area, a  competition gymnasium, a locker room, and a tornado shelter, along with renovations, are to be completed.

Neighborhoods served 
Several Dallas communities such as portions of Preston Hollow (including a portion of Old Preston Hollow, Preston Hollow North, and Preston Hollow West), University Meadows, a small portion of Vickery Meadow, and a portion of Addison are zoned to Hillcrest.

Notable alumni 

 Jefferson Stein (2007), film director
 Colin Allred NFL football player, US House member.
 John D. Arnold (1992) Commodities trader.
 Rickey Bolden (1980) Former NFL Football player - Cleveland Browns 1984 - 1990
 J. William Harbour M.D. is an ocular oncologist, cancer researcher, and Chair of Ophthalmology at the University of Texas Southwestern Medical Center in Dallas.
 Lane P. Hughston (1969) Mathematician. 
 Linda Koop (1968) former Texas House representative
 Quin Mathews (1969) Filmmaker, journalist and broadcaster.
 John McClamrock (1975) American football player gravely injured during a game.
 Harriet Miers (1963) former White House Counsel.
 Glenn Morshower (1977) actor, best known for playing Secret Service Agent Aaron Pierce in 24.
 Greg Pak comic book artist
 Erric Pegram former NFL football player.
 Damien Robinson (1992) Former NFL football player.
 Ajai Sanders (1985) actress and stand-up comic.
 Kurt Thomas NBA player.

References

External links 

 

Dallas Independent School District high schools
Public high schools in Dallas